Hans Burgener (born ) is a Swiss wheelchair curler.

Career
He participated in the 2018 Winter Paralympics where Swiss team finished on sixth place.

At the national level, he is a 2018, 2019 and 2020 Swiss wheelchair curling champion.

Teams

References

External links 

Hans BURGENER - Athlete Profile - World Para Nordic Skiing - Live results | International Paralympic Committee
 Video: 

Living people
1964 births
Swiss male curlers
Swiss wheelchair curlers
Paralympic wheelchair curlers of Switzerland
Wheelchair curlers at the 2018 Winter Paralympics
Wheelchair curlers at the 2022 Winter Paralympics
Swiss wheelchair curling champions